Exile Hill is an isolated hill in the Spectrum Range of northern British Columbia, Canada, located southeast of Mess Lake. It lies at the southern end of Mount Edziza Provincial Park.

History
Exile Hill was named on 2 January 1980 by the Geological Survey of Canada after the Wetalth people, a group of people who lived here in times past, outcast or exiled from the Tahltans.

Geology
Exile Hill is a volcanic feature associated with the Spectrum Range volcanic complex which in turn form part of the Northern Cordilleran Volcanic Province. It is a cinder cone that formed in the Pliocene period.

See also
List of volcanoes in Canada
List of Northern Cordilleran volcanoes
Volcanism of Canada
Volcanism of Western Canada

References

Cinder cones of British Columbia
Mount Edziza volcanic complex
Monogenetic volcanoes
Pliocene volcanoes
One-thousanders of British Columbia